Corduene was an ancient historical region, located south of Lake Van, present-day eastern Turkey.

Many believe that the Kardouchoi—mentioned in Xenophon’s Anabasis as having given his 10,000 troops a mauling as they retreated from Persia in 401 BCE—were the ancestors of the Kurds.

According to the 1911 Encyclopædia Britannica, Gordyene is the ancient name of the region of Bohtan (now Şırnak Province). It is mentioned as Beth Qardu in Syriac sources and is described as a small vassal state between Armenia and Parthian Empire in the mountainous area south of Lake Van in modern Turkey Corduene must also be sought on the left bank of the Tigris. Corduene is documented as a fertile mountainous district, rich in pasturage.

The Kingdom of Gordyene emerged from the declining Seleucid Empire and for most of its history, it was a province of the Roman Empire and acknowledged the sovereignty of Rome. From 189 to 90 BC, it enjoyed a period of independence. The people of Gordyene were known to have worshiped the Hurrian sky god Teshub.

Origins
According to Arshak Safrastian, the Medes and Scythians mentioned in classical Greek literature existed only as preconceived notions. Equating the Carduchi with the Gutians, he adds that the moment the Ten Thousand began to skirt the lower slopes of the Hamrin Mountains, they were in contact with the tribes of Gutium which are presented here as Medes or Scythians. A direct Gutian connection, however, is unlikely, as the Gutians were not Indo-Iranians and only known to have lived in southern Mesopotamia.

Carduchoi in Xenophon
A people called the Carduchoi are mentioned in Xenophon's Anabasis. They inhabited the mountains north of the Tigris in 401 BC, living in well-provisioned villages. They were enemies to the king of Persia, as were the Greek mercenaries with Xenophon, but their response to thousands of armed and desperate strangers was hostile. They had no heavy troops who could face the battle-hardened hoplites, but they used longbows and slings effectively, and for the Greeks the "seven days spent in traversing the country of the Carduchians had been one long continuous battle, which had cost them more suffering than the whole of their troubles at the hands of the king [of Persia] and Tissaphernes put together."

They have been also mentioned as Gordi by Hecataeus of Miletus c. 520 BC.

Korduk' in Armenian sources

The region of Corduene was called Korduk' in Armenian sources. In these records, unlike in the Greek ones, the people of Korduk' were loyal to Armenian rule and the rulers of Korduk' are presented as members of the Armenian nobility. A prince of Korduk' served in the counsel of the Armenian king Trdat and helped to defend Armenia's southern borders. Additionally, it seems that there was the early presence of the Armenian Apostolic Church in Korduk'.

Corduene in Jewish sources
This region is traditionally identified with the landing site in Deluge mythology. In the targumim, Noah's landing place after the flood is given as 'Qadron' or 'Qardu'. Jacob Neusner identifies the targumim's locations with Corduene. According to the Aggadah, Noah landed in Corduene in Armenia. The early 3rd century BCE Babylonian writer Berossus was also of the opinion that Xisthros landed with his ship in Corduene. Josephus cited the evidence of Berossus as proof that the Flood was not a myth and also mentioned that the remains of the Ark were still visible in the district of Carron, presumably identical with Korduene.
Jewish sources trace the origins of the people of Corduene to the marriage of Jinns of King Solomon with 500 beautiful Jewish women.

Corduene in Roman sources

He recorded its main cities as Sareisa, Satalca and Pinaca (northwest of Bezabde), and considered its inhabitants (Gordyaeans) as descendants of the ancient Carduchians. According to him, the inhabitants had an exceptional repute as master-builders and as experts in the construction of siege engines and for this reason Tigranes used them in such work; he also notices the country for its naphtha resources. Ammianus Marcellinus visited this region while on a diplomatic visit to the satrap of Corduene. Eretrians who were exiled and deported by the Persians to Mesopotamia, were said to have taken up their dwelling in the region of Gordyene.

According to Strabo the Gordyaeans received their name from Gordys son of Triptolemus, who assisted in searching after Io, and then settled in Gordyaea district of Phrygia.

Pompey and Corduene

Both Phraates III and Tigranes the Great laid claim to this province.  However, it was conquered by the Roman troops under Pompey. The local population (called Gordyeni) did not defend the Armenian rule since according to Plutarch, Tigranes had demolished their native cities and had forced them into exile in Tigranocerta. In 69 BC, Zarbienus, the king of Corduene, was secretly planning for a revolt against Tigranes. He was negotiating with Appius Claudius for Roman help. However the plan was revealed and he was killed by Tigranes. After this, Lucullus raised a monument to Zarbienus and then he took over the region of Corduene. He took part in the funeral of Zarbienus, offered royal robes, gold and the spoils (taken from Tigranes), and called him his companion and confederate of the Romans.

After Pompey's success in subjugating Armenia and part of Pontus, and the Roman advance across the Euphrates, Phraates was anxious to have a truce with the Romans. However, Pompey held him in contempt and demanded back the territory of Corduene. He sent envoys, but after receiving no answer, he sent Afranius into the territory and occupied it without a battle. The Parthians who were found in possession were driven beyond the frontier and pursued even as far as Arbela in Adiabene.  According to an inscription dedicated to the temple of Venus, Pompey gave protection to the newly acquired territory of Gordyene.

Armenian presence 

Tigran retained Gordyene and Nisibis, which Pompeius withheld from the Parthians. Gordyene belonged to Urartu for about 200 years and to Armenia for about 250 years.

Districts of Cordyene under Armenian period were:

 Korduq (or Korduk), Kordiq Nerkin, Kordiq Verin, Kordiq Mijin, Tshauk, Aitvanq, Vorsirank (or Orsirank), Aigarq, Motolanq, Kartuniq, Albag.

Diocletian and Corduene
Corduene was conquered again by Diocletian in the 3rd century and the Roman presence in the region was formally recognized in a peace treaty signed between Diocletian and the Persians. Diocletian then raised an army unit from this region under the title Ala XV Flavia Carduenorum, naming it after his Caesar Constantine the Great.

Following the defeat of Narseh, the Sassanid King, at the hands of the Romans in 296, a peace treaty was signed between the two sides, according to which the steppes of northern Mesopotamia, with Singara and the hill country on the left bank of the Tigris as far as Gordyene (Corduene), were also ceded to the victors (Romans).

The name of the province appears again in the account of the campaign between the Persians led by Shapur II and the Romans led by Julian the Apostate (and after Julian's death, by Jovian). The Romans started to retreat through Corduene after they could not besiege Ctesiphon.

Shapur's campaign against Corduene

In the spring of 360, Shapur II staged a campaign to capture the city of Singara (probably modern Shingar or Sinjar northwest of Mosul). The town fell after a few days of siege. From Singara, Shapur directed his march almost due northwards, and leaving Nisibis unassailed upon his left, proceeded to attack the strong fort known indifferently as Pinaca (Phaenicha) or Bezabde. This was a position on the east bank of the Tigris, near the point where that river quits the mountains and debouches upon the plain; though not on the site, it may be considered the representative of the modern Jezireh (Cizre in southeastern Turkey), which commands the passes from the low country into the Kurdish mountains. It was much valued by Rome, was fortified in places with a double wall, and was guarded by three legions and a large body of Kurdish archers. Shapur sent a flag of truce to demand a surrender, joining with the messengers some prisoners of high rank taken at Singara, lest the enemy should open fire upon his envoys. The device was successful; but the garrison proved staunch, and determined on resisting to the last. After a long siege, the wall was at last breached, the city taken, and its defenders indiscriminately massacred.

In 363, a treaty was signed in which Jovian ceded five provinces beyond the Euphrates including Corduene and Arzanene and towns of Nisibis and Singara to the Sassanids. Following this treaty, Greeks living in those lands emigrated due to persecution of Christians at the hands of Shapur and the Zoroastrians.

Corduene was a bishop's see since at least 424.

In the 6th and 7th centuries
In 578, the Byzantine emperor Flavius Mauricius Tiberius Augustus defeated the Sassanid army led by Chosroes I, and conquered Corduene and incorporated it once again in the Roman empire. The Roman army also liberated 10,000 Christian captives of the Sassanids. According to Khwarizmi, Arabs conquered the area along with Nisbis and Tur Abdin in 640.

List of rulers
 Zarbienus; early mid-1st century BC: A king of Corduene who made overtures to Appius Claudius when the latter was staying at Antiocheia, wishing to shake off the yoke of Tigranes. He was betrayed and was assassinated with his wife and children before the Romans entered Armenia. When Lucullus arrived he celebrated his funeral rites with great pomp, setting fire to the funeral pile with his own hand, and had a sumptuous monument erected to him.
 Manisarus; ~ 115 AD: He took control over parts of Armenia and Mesopotamia, in the time of Trajan. The Parthian king Osroes declared war against him, which led to Manisarus siding with the Romans.
 J̌on / Čon; Only attested in the 5th-century Armenian work Buzandaran Patmut‘iwnk‘. His name may have been an Armenian transliteration of the Roman name Iovinianus.
 Iovinianus; Attested in 359 by Roman soldier and historian Ammianus Marcellinus (died between 391–400).

Corduene, Carduchi, and the Kurds

Some identify Corduene and Carduchi with the modern Kurds, considering that Carduchi was the ancient lexical equivalent of "Kurdistan". It has been suggested that Corduene was proto-Kurdish or as equivalent to modern-day Kurdistan.

Other modern scholars reject a Kurdish connection.

There were numerous forms of this name, partly due to the difficulty of representing kh in Latin. The spelling Karduchoi is itself probably borrowed from Armenian, since the termination -choi represents the Armenian language plural suffix -k'.

It is speculated that Carduchi spoke an Old Iranian language.

See also
 Ark of Nuh or Noah
 Armenian highlands
 Mountains of Ararat
 Moxoene
 Thamanin
 Zagros Mountains
 Mount Judi

Notes

Sources

External links
Corduene or Gordyene, Classical Dictionary of Biography, Mythology and Geography.
Geography, Strabo, Book XVI, Chapter 1, Section 24.
Kurds and Kurdistan, see section iii History, subsection A Origins and Pre-Islamic History, Encyclopaedia of Islam.
 Map of Corduene
Map of Gordyene between Assyria and Lake Van
Theodor Mommsen History of Rome, The Establishment of the Military Monarchy, Page 53
Decline and Fall of the Roman Empire
Roman History, by Cassius Dio, Book XXX
The History of the Decline and Fall of the Roman Empire, Vol. 2, Chapter XXIV, Part IV, The Retreat and Death of Julian], by Edward Gibbon.
 History of Rome, The Establishment of the Military Monarchy, by Theodor Mommsen, page 24.
History of the Later Roman Empire, by J. B. Bury, Chapter IV.
 The Seven Great Monarchies Of The Ancient Eastern World, Vol 7:  The Sassanian or New Persian Empire, 1871, by George Rawlinson.

Historical regions in Turkey
Provinces of the Kingdom of Armenia (antiquity)
History of Şırnak Province